Marlboro Mountain is a mountain which is the peak of the Marlboro Mountains. Located in the state of New York west of Poughkeepsie. Illinois Mountain is located north of Marlboro Mountain.

References

Mountains of Ulster County, New York
Mountains of New York (state)